Rayagada is a municipality in Rayagada district in the Indian state of Odisha. It is the administrative headquarters of Rayagada district.

History
The city of Rayagada was founded by King Vishwanath Dev Gajapati (1527-1531 CE) of the Suryavansh dynasty of Nandapur Kingdom. It served as the capital of an extensive dominion that stretched from the confines of Bengal to Telangana in the south and was a great center of trade and commerce in the coastal regions of the country. There was also a fort constructed by the king and a row of shrines built along the river Nagavali including the temple of Majhighariani Temple who was considered the guardian deity of the place. Until 1947, the city was in the domains of the Jeypore Maharajahs.

Demographics
 India census, Rayagada had a population of 57,732. Males constitute 51% of the population and females 49%. In Rayagada, 12% of the population is under 6 years of age. The population of Rayagada town as per 2011 census is 71,208 out of which male population is 36,036 and female population is 35,172.Rayagada has an average literacy rate of 64%, lower than the national average of 74.4%: male literacy is 72%, and female literacy is 56%

Notable people
 Purnachandra Bidika, the gold medalist in Asian Power lifting Championship
 Varun Sandesh, an actor in Tollywood films
 Ritesh Agarwal, the current CEO and the founder of Oyo rooms

Politics
Current MLA from Rayagada(ST) assembly constituency is Shri Makaranda Muduli(Independent). Previous MLA from Rayagada (ST) Assembly Constituency is Shri Lal Bihari Himrika of Biju Janata Dal, who won the seat in State elections in 2009 Lalbihari Himirika of BJD had won this seat in 2000.
After serving as deputy speaker of Odisha assembly, he was serving as a cabinet minister for SC and ST development minister.

Rayagada is part of Koraput (Lok Sabha constituency).
Shri Jayram Pangi (Biju Janta Dal) won the general election 2009 defeating Dr. Giridhar Gomango (INC) who represented this constituency 9 times. Jhina Hikaka who won in 2014 elections. Current MP is Shri Saptagiri Sankar Ulaka from INC.

Currently N. Bhaskar Rao has been elected to Rajya Sabha from Rayagada.

References

External links
 Official website of Rayagada district

Cities and towns in Rayagada district